Souvenirs is an American swing revival band that is currently active, since 1993.

The band was signed to RCA Victor and had two albums on that label, as well as two under indie labels in Austin, Texas.  Souvenirs is named after the film , directed by Federico Fellini, and the song "Souvenirs" by gypsy jazz guitarist Django Reinhardt

The band appeared on Austin City Limits in April 1998.

Personnel
The band lineup evolved over the years. During different periods, the personnel included:
 
 Olivier Giraud (guitar, vocals) The founder and key member of the Souvenirs. Now a member of the band Continental Graffiti.
 Tony Balbineau (vocals, rhythm guitar)
 Todd Wulfmeyer (bass)
 Kathy Kiser (vocals)
 Glover Gill (piano)
 Adam Berlin (drums)
 Juliana Sheffield (vocals)
 Kevin Smith (bass)
 Justin Sherburn (piano)
 Rob Kidd (drums)
 Chrysta Bell (vocals)

Discography
 Happy Feet (RCA Victor, 1995)
 Souvonica (Continental Club, 1997)
 Twisted Desire (RCA, 1999)
 Live Memories (Giraudo, 2000)

References

External links
Chrysta Bell website
Todd Wulfmeyer's myspace

Musical groups from Austin, Texas
Swing revival ensembles
1993 establishments in Texas
Jazz musicians from Texas
American jazz ensembles from Texas